Depotodden is a headland in Gustav V Land at Nordaustlandet, Svalbard. It is located south of the mountain of Basisfjellet on the peninsula Laponiahalvøya, at the northeastern side of Brennevinsfjorden.

References

Headlands of Nordaustlandet